Barry Kutun (born August 30, 1941) was an American politician in the state of Florida.

Kutun was born in New York City and moved to Florida in 1943, attending the University of Florida and University of Miami School of Law. Kutun served in the Florida House of Representatives from 1973 to 1982 representing the 99th district, and from 1983 to 1986, representing the 104th district.  Kutun was a Democrat at the time.

References

Living people
1941 births
Democratic Party members of the Florida House of Representatives